In geometry, the small stellapentakis dodecahedron is a nonconvex isohedral polyhedron. It is the dual of the truncated great dodecahedron. It has 60 intersecting triangular faces.

Proportions 
The dihedral angle equals . Part of each triangle lies within the solid, hence is invisible in solid models.

References

External links 
 
 Uniform polyhedra and duals

Nonconvex polyhedra
Dual uniform polyhedra